Aaron Lowe (born October 12, 1974) is a Canadian ice dancer. With partner and wife Megan Wing, he is a two-time Four Continents bronze medallist.

Career 
Lowe was born in Vancouver, British Columbia. He began in hockey at the age of seven and switched to figure skating when he was nine. He began skating with Megan Wing in 1986. They won six bronze medals and four silver medals at the Canadian Figure Skating Championships. In 2006, the duo competed in the Winter Olympics, where they finished 11th overall. On April 25, 2006, Wing and Lowe announced officially their retirement from competitive skating.

Wing and Lowe coach in British Columbia. Their students include:
 Miku Makita / Tyler Gunara
 Haley Sales / Nikolas Wamsteeker
 Nicole Orford / Thomas Williams
 Madeline Edwards / Zhao Kai Pang
 Noa Bruser / Timothy Lum
 Sara Aghai / Jussiville Partanen
 Tarrah Harvey/ Keith Gagnon
 Lee Ho-jung / Richard Kang-in Kam

Personal life 
Wing / Lowe's twins, a daughter and son named Keauna Auburn Wing Lowe and Tayson Pierce Wing Lowe, were born on October 6, 2011.

Programs

Competitive highlights
GP: ISU Champions Series / Grand Prix

with Wing

1995–1996 to 2005–2006

1989–1990 to 1994–1995

References

External links 
 
 Megan Wing and Aaron Lowe official website
 
 
 
 
 

1974 births
Living people
Canadian male ice dancers
Figure skaters at the 2006 Winter Olympics
Four Continents Figure Skating Championships medalists
Olympic figure skaters of Canada
Figure skaters from Vancouver
Sportspeople from Windsor, Ontario
21st-century Canadian people